In mathematics, the Crofton formula, named after Morgan Crofton (1826–1915), is a classic result of integral geometry relating the length of a curve to the expected number of times a "random" line intersects it.

Statement
Suppose  is a rectifiable plane curve. We can parametrize the general line ℓ by the direction  in which it points and its signed distance  from the origin. The Crofton formula expresses the arc length of the curve  in terms of an integral over the space of all oriented lines:

The differential form

It is usually called the kinematic measure.

The right-hand side in the Crofton formula is sometimes called the Favard length.

Then for any rectifiable surface  of codimension 1, we havewhere

Proof sketch
Both sides of the Crofton formula are additive over concatenation of curves, so it suffices to prove the formula for a single line segment. Since the right-hand side does not depend on the positioning of the line segment, it must equal some function of the segment's length. Because, again, the formula is additive over concatenation of line segments, the integral must be a constant times the length of the line segment. It remains only to determine the factor of 1/4; this is easily done by computing both sides when γ is the unit circle.

The proof for the generalized version proceeds exactly as above.

Poincare’s formula for intersecting curves 
Let  be the Euclidean group on the plane.

Given rectifiable simple (no self-intersection) curves  in the plane, then The proof is done similarly as above. Then explicitly calculate this constant, using the simplest possible case: two circles of radius 1.

Other forms
The space of oriented lines is a double cover of the space of unoriented lines. The Crofton formula is often stated in terms of the corresponding density in the latter space, in which the numerical factor is not 1/4 but 1/2. Since a convex curve intersects almost every line either twice or not at all, the unoriented Crofton formula for convex curves can be stated without numerical factors: the measure of the set of straight lines which intersect a convex curve is equal to its length.

The same formula (with the same multiplicative constants) apply for hyperbolic spaces and spherical spaces, when the kinematic measure is suitably scaled. The proof is essentially the same.

The Crofton formula generalizes to any Riemannian surface; the integral is then performed with the natural measure on the space of geodesics.

More general forms exist, such as the kinematic formula of Chern.

Applications
Crofton's formula yields elegant proofs of the following results, among others:
Given two nested, convex, closed curves, the inner one is shorter. In general, for two such codimension 1 surfaces, the inner one has less area.
Given two nested, convex, closed surfaces , with  nested inside , the probability of a random line  intersecting the inner surface , conditional on it intersecting the outer surface , isThis is the justification for the surface area heuristic in bounding volume hierarchy.
Barbier's theorem: Every curve of constant width w has perimeter w.
The isoperimetric inequality: Among all closed curves with a given perimeter, the circle has the unique maximum area.
The convex hull of every bounded rectifiable closed curve C has perimeter at most the length of C, with equality only when C is already a convex curve.
General  gives generalization of Barbier's theorem for bodies of constant brightness.

See also 
 Buffon's noodle
 The Radon transform can be viewed as a measure-theoretic generalization of the Crofton formula and the Crofton formula is used in the inversion formula of the k-plane Radon transform of Gel'fand and  Graev  
 Steinhaus longimeter

References

External links 
 Cauchy–Crofton formula page, with demonstration applets
 Alice, Bob, and the average shadow of a cube, a visualization of Cauchy's surface area formula.

Integral geometry
Measure theory
Differential geometry